Sten R. E. Mellgren (28 August 1900 – 3 September 1989) was a Swedish football (soccer) player who competed in the 1924 Summer Olympics. He was a member of the Swedish team, which won the bronze medal in the football tournament.

He managed Västerås SK Fotboll.

References

External links

profile
  player club AIK - Sten Robert Fredrik Mellgren

1900 births
1989 deaths
Association football defenders
Footballers at the 1924 Summer Olympics
Medalists at the 1924 Summer Olympics
Olympic bronze medalists for Sweden
Olympic footballers of Sweden
Olympic medalists in football
Sweden international footballers
Sweden men's national ice hockey team coaches
Swedish footballers
Swedish football managers
Västerås SK Fotboll managers
IFK Stockholm players
AIK Fotboll players